Joseph George Ramsden (July 3, 1867 to December 28, 1946) was a long active municipal politician in Toronto, Ontario, Canada. He was born in Thornhill, Ontario and first became active in politics working for Alexander Mackenzie in a York East by-election. He served for fifteen years as Chief Inspector for the Department of Indian Affairs, which saw him travel extensively through the north of the country. He was also a businessman owning a bakery and other stores in the city.

He was first elected to Toronto City Council in 1903 and retired as a member of the Toronto Board of Control in 1936. In total he won sixteen elections over that period, also losing office at several points. He was a Liberal Party member in a city whose politics were then dominated by the Tories. In 1935 he attempted to run for mayor but finished a distant third behind Co-operative Commonwealth Federation member James Simpson and conservative Harry W. Hunt. He was nicknamed the "Watchdog of the Treasury" for his focus on reducing spending whenever possible.

Ramsden Park on Yonge Street just north of Davenport is named after him.

References
"Treasury Watchdog, George Ramsden Dies." The Globe and Mail. December 29, 1948 pg. 4

1867 births
1946 deaths
Toronto city councillors